Laforest is a surname. Notable people with the surname include:

Andrée Laforest, Canadian politician
Bob Laforest (born 1963), Canadian ice hockey player
Edmond Laforest (1876– 1915), Haitian poet
Guy Laforest (born 1955), Canadian political scientist
Jean-Guy Laforest (born 1944), Canadian politician
Jean-Louis Dubut de Laforest (1853–1902), French author
Jean-Yves Laforest (born 1949), Canadian politician
Juliette Bussière Laforest-Courtois (1789–1853), Haitian teacher and journalist
Mark Laforest (born 1962), Canadian ice hockey goaltender
Pete Laforest (born 1978),  Canadian baseball catcher and manager
Ty LaForest (1917–1947), Canadian baseball player

See also
De Forest (disambiguation)
Laforest railway station, located in the community of Laforest, Ontario, Canada
Leforest

French-language surnames
Surnames of French origin